Scott Holiday is the guitarist of the rock and roll band Rival Sons. He is from Huntington Beach, California.

Musical career
Scott's first successful band was Human Lab, who signed a deal in 2000 with Atlantic Records that was negotiated by Ian Montone (manager of Jack White). The band wrote and recorded a debut album with producers Michael Beinhorn and Mark "Spike" Stent in Henson studios, Los Angeles and Olympic studios, UK, but the album was never released.

Searching for a more visceral, dangerous sound, and after leaving Atlantic Records in 2004 Scott Holiday started a new band with Thomas Flowers of Oleander and J. Harley Gilmore (Weylon Krieger, Blu Cantrell) called Black Summer Crush in 2005. 
Gilmore departed in early 2006, leaving Holiday/Flowers in search for a rhythm section. After a series of auditions Holiday was introduced to Michael Miley and knew he was the right fit. After trying several bassists, Miley suggested Robin Everhart, who eventually joined the band. BSC recorded together from 2006 to 2009. In 2008 the band released the song Lucky Girl that featured on 20th Century Fox' blockbuster movie Jumper with Hayden Christensen, Jamie Bell, Rachel Bilson and Samuel L. Jackson. The band also played Przystanek Woodstock and soon after signed a deal with EMI.

Scott Holiday was then introduced to producer Dave Cobb who became a writing partner for the new album with help from Michael Miley and Robin Everhart. This was Scott Holiday's first experience of writing on the spot that became a trade-mark of Rival Sons' sound.

Scott was keen to find a writing partner and singer that felt right and came across Jay Buchanan's music on MySpace. Michael Miley had previously played with him in his band Buchanan. Scott knew straight away that Jay was the singer he'd been looking for, and they met up and discussed old vinyl, and Jay agreed to give Rival Sons a try. Scott Holiday said: "He looked at me and said, 'Guess we're gonna do this band.' And so we did."

The band re-recorded 'Before the Fire' with Jay Buchanan on vocals in 2009. He sang 'On My Way' in one take and from then on the band was Rival Sons.

The guitarist played as a guest on the Randy Bachman song Ton of Bricks, on his 2015 album Heavy Blues.

Equipment

Guitars
Fano GF6 
Gibson Firebird VII (reverse)
Gibson Firebird V (non-reverse)
meloduende custom b-bones
Kauer Banshee (custom built)
Fender Jazzmaster
Martin Acoustics
National Dobro Acoustics
Art Davis Custom Acoustic

Amps
Orange OR50
Orange Thunderverb
Reeves Custom 30
Silvertone 1484
VOX AC30
assorted National and Supro amps

Effects
Scott Holiday uses an assorted arsenal of pedals and "fuzz boxes" that "took a lifetime to find and configure into my own sound".
Around 2015 he started using the Deep Trip BOG in his live rig. And in April 2016, in his new triple Salvage Custom rig, he also added the Deep Trip Hellbender. Those two were also used in studio for the Hollow Bones album (released on June 10, 2016).

References

External links
 Official Rival Sons website
 Interview with Scott Holiday

Living people
American rock guitarists
American male guitarists
Guitarists from California
1991 births